Events from the year 1799 in Canada.

Incumbents
Monarch: George III

Federal government
Parliament of Lower Canada: 2nd 
Parliament of Upper Canada: 2nd

Governors
Governor of the Canadas: Guy Carleton, 1st Baron Dorchester
Governor of New Brunswick: Thomas Carleton
Governor of Nova Scotia: John Wentworth
Commodore-Governor of Newfoundland: John Elliot
Governor of St. John's Island: Edmund Fanning
Governor of Upper Canada: John Graves Simcoe

Events
 David Thompson marries Charlotte Small
 North West Company establishes a fur post at Rocky Mountain House, Alberta. The nearby Hudson's Bay Company fur post which is also established at this time is called Acton House.
 Alexander Mackenzie resigns from North West Company 
 George Vancouver's Journeys to the North Pacific Ocean published in London 
 Handsome Lake, a Seneca chief, founds the Longhouse religion 
 Russian-American Fur Company chartered; launches aggressive policy in Aleutians and on Northwest Coast.
 American competition for West Indies trade kills Liverpool, Nova Scotia's merchant fleet.
 Alexander Baranov establishes Russian post known today as Old Sitka; trade charter grants exclusive trading rights to the Russian American Company.
 Vermont answers Indian chiefs, in Canada, that their claims were extinguished by treaties of 1763 and 1783 between France, Great Britain and the United States.
 Two cases are filed challenging slavery in New Brunswick: R v Jones and R v Agnew.

Births
September 8 – Sir William Young, Premier of Nova Scotia (d.1887)
October 30 – Ignace Bourget, bishop of the Diocese of Montreal (d.1885)

Full date unknown
Joseph Cunard, merchant, shipbuilder and politician (d.1865)

Deaths
January 15 – Alexander McKee, agent for the Indian Department (b.1735)

Full date unknown
 Philip Turnor, HBC inland surveyor (b.1751)

Historical documents
Chief Joseph Brandt gets intelligence from Delaware about French attempts to recruit "Southern and Western Indians" to invade Canada

Joseph Brant explains how former Lieut. Gov. Simcoe obstructed rights promised Six Nations by Gov. Haldimand, and asks for redress

References 

 
99